Ablaze is a 2001 American direct-to-video action disaster film, starring John Bradley, Tom Arnold and Michael Dudikoff. It was directed by Jim Wynorski. The film uses stock footage from two other films. The car chase scene at the beginning of the film is edited from the 1993 film Striking Distance. Ablaze also extensively uses footage from the film City on Fire throughout the film. The film also contains stock footage from the 1970s TV Show Emergency!

Plot
Andrew Thomas is an agent tasked with recording the violations made at an oil refinery that resides next to a suburban town. His brother Jack is a firefighter who has just introduced a new member to his team, Scott, who becomes hostile with fellow firefighter Gary Daniels. Meanwhile, at a hospital in the town, one of the doctors, and Jack's ex-girlfriend Jennifer Lewis, defies the orders of her boss Vivian Sims to help a pregnant woman named Mindi Hunter, who's about to go into labor. Jennifer, and Winslow, one of the nurses, help Mindi prepare to give birth. Meanwhile, a young kid named Barry Christopher accidentally sets his house on fire by lighting a match on a toy plane, and Jack's team is sent by chief Sam Davis to rescue him. They rescue Barry, and he is sent to the hospital with his mother Gwen. Jack is also injured in the fire, and is sent to the hospital.

Andrew, meanwhile, finds numerous violations taking place at the refinery, as well as discovering a plot to burn the refinery down to collect the insurance money. The planned explosion soon occurs, and Andrew is injured in the explosion. The assistant of the refinery's manager Curt Peters, and worker Rick Woods take Andrew to the hospital, where he reveals the real motive of his visit. As the fire begins to spread across the city, slowly reaching the town, the refinery's manager Wendell Mays sends Peters, and Woods to retrieve a document from Andrew's office concerning the violations. Peters retrieves the documents, although he's burned alive in the process, and is soon run over by a car, killing him. Woods decides to forget the document, and drives off. Davis orders the hospital to be evacuated due to the fire spreading towards it. He angrily confronts the city's mayor Phillips as a result of his involvement in the initial explosion. Jack recovers in the hospital, and is told by doctor Stuart Ridgley that his brother is in critical condition. He visits Andrew, who gives him one last tearful goodbye before dying. An actress named Elizabeth Sherman enters the hospital, offering to help tend to the injured. Barry experiences an asthma attack as a result of the fire, although is taken care of. Mindi successfully gives birth to a girl named Hailey, and the evacuation begins. Wendell, and Vivian are evacuated in a truck, although one of the buildings they pass explodes, causing the truck to catch on fire, and killing them both.

Elizabeth is soon killed in the fire while trying to seek the help of Daniels, and the other firefighters. With the help of news cameraman Tim Vester, Jack manages to evacuate the people in the hospital to various rescue units. However, while racing to the units, Tim is killed by falling scaffolding. Alaina Charles, a news reporter Tim was filming, attempts to save him, only to be crushed herself by another piece of scaffolding. Everybody else, including Winslow, Mindi, Barry, and Gwen, reach the rescue units, and are taken to makeshift hospitals along a nearby river. Jennifer, and Ridgley struggle to reach the units, although Jack rescues them, and he, and his team send off the last unit before a catastrophic explosion destroys the entire section of the city. All of the firefighters survive the explosion, and Jack reunites with Jennifer. In the aftermath of the disaster, Phillips is arrested by Davis.

Cast
 John Bradley as Jack Thomas, a fire chief.
 Tom Arnold as Wendell Mays, the greedy owner of the oil refinery.
 Michael Dudikoff as Gary Daniels, a member on Jack's team.
 Ice-T as Albert Denning, a police officer.
 Amanda Pays as Dr. Jennifer Lewis, Jack's ex-girlfriend, and the doctor at the hospital.
 Cathy Lee Crosby as Elizabeth Sherman, a former actress who assists the doctors during the firestorm.
 Pat Harrington, Jr. as Dr. Stuart Ridgley, one of the doctors at the hospital.
 Edward Albert as Mayor Phillips, the town's corrupt mayor.
 Mary Jo Catlett as Nurse Winslow, a nurse at the hospital.
 Melissa Braselle as Mindi Hunter, a pregnant woman about to go into labor who Jennifer, and Winslow help during the fire.'
 Larry Poindexter as Andrew Thomas, Jack's estranged younger brother who is sent to report Wendell's violations.
 Carolyn Seymour as Dr. Vivian Sims, the corrupt manager of the hospital who also is a doctor.
 William Zabka as Curt Peters, Wendell's assistant.
 Richard Biggs as Garrison, a member of Jack's team.
 Michael Trucco as Scott, a new member on Jack's team.
 Michael Cavanaugh as Chief Sam Davis, Andrew's boss, and the head of the medical unit.
 Eric James Virgets as Workman, a member of Jack's team.
 David Bowe as Rick Woods, a worker at the refinery.
 Dorian Lopinto as Gwen Christopher, a woman living in the town.
 Scotty Cox as Barry Christopher, Gwen's son.
 Sharron Leigh as Alaina Charles, a news reporter.
 Christian Oliver as Tim Vester, Alaina's cameraman.
 Robert Clotworthy as Harris, a dispatcher on the medical unit.
 Dane Farwell as Freddy, a criminal that Jack, and Albert kill early in the film.

Reception
The film got extremely negative reviews. On IMDb Ablaze holds a score 3.2 out of 10. The blog Crane Shot argues that the film is so bad that is good, stating: "Phoenician Entertainment and director Jim Wynorski (CHOPPING MALL) attempt an Irwin Allen-style disaster flick that is just unintentionally hilarious enough to be entertaining. A large cast of familiar faces and the amusement of spotting stock footage from other movies, which Wynorski uses in lieu of filming his own action scenes, provide much of the fun in ABLAZE."

References

External links
 
 Ablaze at Letter Box D
 Ablaze at Moviefone

2001 films
2001 direct-to-video films
2001 action films
American action films
American disaster films
Films about firefighting
Films directed by Jim Wynorski
2000s English-language films
2000s American films
English-language action films